This is a list of theatrical animated feature films produced or released by Metro-Goldwyn-Mayer.

Films

US releases

Highest grossing films

Notes 
Release Notes

Studio/Production Notes

See also 
 List of Metro-Goldwyn-Mayer films

References

External links 
 

American animated films

Animation
Lists of Metro-Goldwyn-Mayer films
Lists of American animated films